Ideal College, also known as Ideal College Dhanmondi, is one of the oldest private colleges in Dhanmandi, Dhaka. It was founded In 1969.

It offers higher secondary education in science, commerce and humanities.

History
Ideal College is located in the heart of Dhaka City which has been providing its contribution in endurable education for 5 decades. This college was established in 1969. There are eighteen departments, eighty three teachers and around sixty administrative staffs in this college. In H.S.C. level including 1st year and 2nd year, there is about four thousand students who are studying have as science, arts and commerce discipline.

See also
 List of colleges in Bangladesh
 List of universities in Bangladesh
 Education in Bangladesh

References

External links
 Official website 

Dhanmondi
Colleges in Dhaka District
Educational institutions established in 1969
1969 establishments in East Pakistan